Canossa is a town in Italy.

Canossa may also refer to:

 Canossa Academy Lipa, in the Philippines
 Canossa Castle, in Italy
 Canossa College, in Hong Kong
 Canossa Hospital, in Hong Kong
 Canossa School of Santa Rosa, Laguna
 Canossa, Edmonton
 House of Canossa, noble family
 Giovanni Battista Canossa (died 1747), Italian wood engraver
 Luigi di Canossa (1809–1900), cardinal
 Palazzo Canossa, Verona

See also 

 Canosa (disambiguation)